This is an incomplete list of works by the German Romantic artist Caspar David Friedrich (1774–1840) by completion date where known. Friedrich was a prolific artist who produced over 500 attributed works; however, he is generally known for only a small number of works seen as emblems of Romanticism.

In line with Romantic ideals of the time, Friedrich intended that his paintings would function visually only, and thus he was cautious that the titles given to his work were not overly descriptive or evocative. It is likely that some of today's relatively literal titles, such as The Stages of Life, were not given by the artist himself, but were instead adopted during one of the revivals of interest in the artist during the late 19th or early 20th century.

Complications arise when dating Friedrich's work, mainly because he often did not directly name or date his canvases. However, he kept a carefully detailed notebook on his output, which has been used by scholars to tie paintings to their completion dates.

Paintings

Drawings, watercolours, and prints

References

Sources
 Siegel, Linda. Caspar David Friedrich and the Age of German Romanticism. Branden Publishing Co, 1978. .
 Vaughan, William. Friedrich. London: Phaidon Press, 2004. .
 Wolf, Norbert. Friedrich. Cologne: Taschen, 2003. .

External links

Caspar David Friedrich Foundation
Hermitage Museum Archive
Web Gallery of Art - collection of Friedrich's works
Artcyclopedia - links to Friedrich's pictures from Image Archives, articles etc.
Biographical timeline, Hamburg Kunsthalle

Friedrich, Caspar